Henry O'Connor (born ) was the Mayor of Galway from 1993 to 1994.

References

 Role of Honour:The Mayors of Galway City 1485-2001, William Henry, Galway 2001.

External links
 https://web.archive.org/web/20071119083053/http://www.galwaycity.ie/AllServices/YourCouncil/HistoryofTheCityCouncil/PreviousMayors/

Politicians from County Galway
Local councillors in Galway (city)
Mayors of Galway
1940s births
Living people